Keira Knightley is a British actress who began her career by appearing in commercials and television films, including  The Treasure Seekers (1996), Coming Home (1998), and Oliver Twist (1999) before making her major motion picture debut in the space-opera epic Star Wars: Episode I – The Phantom Menace (1999) as Padmé Amidala's handmaiden. She portrayed the daughter of Robin Hood in the romantic adventure film Princess of Thieves (2001), her first starring role, and earned her breakthrough by playing a teen tomboy footballer in sports comedy Bend It Like Beckham (2002). A year later, Knightley rose to global stardom after appearing as Elizabeth Swann in the fantasy swashbuckler film Pirates of the Caribbean: The Curse of the Black Pearl, co-starring Johnny Depp and Orlando Bloom, for which she received two Saturn Award nominations, one for Best Supporting Actress.

She then appeared in the Richard Curtis-directed Christmas romance Love Actually (2003) as a woman whose fiancée's best man is secretly in love with her.  Knightley portrayed the daughter of an alcoholic in psychological thriller The Jacket (2005). She starred as Elizabeth Bennet in Joe Wright's romantic drama Pride & Prejudice (2005), for which Knightley received her first nomination for an Academy Award for Best Actress in a Leading Role nomination, becoming the third-youngest Best Actress nominee. The film clinched her long association with period dramas. She reprised her role as Swann in Pirates of the Caribbean: Dead Man's Chest (2006) and Pirates of the Caribbean: At World's End (2007); the former is her highest-grossing release. Knightley subsequently appeared in two wartime dramas; as a complex love interest in Wright's Atonement (2007), which earned her an Empire Award for Best Actress and a jazz singer in the biopic The Edge of Love (2008). She starred as eighteenth-century tastemaker Georgiana Cavendish in the drama The Duchess (2008), for which she received positive reviews.

She made her theatre debut as a shallow, amorous film star in The Misanthrope, which earned Knightley her a nomination for the Olivier Award for Best Actress in a Supporting Role in a Play. Also on West End, she then portrayed a schoolteacher accused of lesbianism in The Children's Hour.  She reunited with Wright for the third time with historical romance Anna Karenina (2012), playing the titular aristocratic socialite to critical acclaim. Knightley expanded into contemporary roles with musical drama Begin Again (2014), starring as an aspiring songwriter, and action thriller Jack Ryan: Shadow Recruit (2014) as a medical student. Her role as an overeducated underachiever in the rom-com Laggies (2014) was followed by a return to historical parts as cryptanalyst Joan Clarke in the drama The Imitation Game (2014), which garnered Knightley an Academy Award for Best Supporting Actress nomination. The following year, she made her Broadway debut in Thérèse Raquin playing a psychotic and repressed wife. Knightley appeared as the eponymous belle époque writer in biographical film Colette (2018) to positive reception. In wartime drama The Aftermath (2019), Knightley portrayed a cold, complex army wife. She starred in succeeding political dramas as whistleblower Katharine Gun in Official Secrets (2019) and feminist Sally Alexander in Misbehaviour (2020).

Film

Television

Theatre

Video games

Music videos

Radio

Discography
Guest appearances

See also 
 List of British actors 
List of British Academy Award nominees and winners
List of actors with Academy Award nominations
List of actors with two or more Academy Award nominations in acting categories
List of awards and nominations received by Keira Knightley

References 

Actress filmographies
British filmographies